The World Strongman Cup Federation ("WSCF") was a worldwide organisation within strength athletics that claimed to be the sport's organising body with the aim of making "the Strongman Sport more popular and accessible for a wide range of the people." Its motto was "be strong". It was also a charity. The Federation organised the World Strongman Cup one of the main competitions in the field of strength athletics boasting participation from some of the foremost strongmen around the globe. It was a separate competition from the World's Strongest Man, the Strongman Super Series (producing a World Champion) and the IFSA World Championship). It has since been replaced by the World Strongman Federation's World Cup.

History
Until completion of the 2004 World's Strongest Man competition, the IFSA managed the annual World's Strongest Man contest. However, that year saw an acrimonious dividing of the sport with the IFSA forming its own competition and with the World's Strongest Man ("WSM") continuing to be organised by TWI, an IMG Media company. The WSM itself was never a federation, but an event organised commercially. When the IFSA formed their own competition and banned their contracted athletes from competing in the WSM, the World Strongman Cup Federation ("WSCF") filled a void and signed up many of the non-IFSA athletes. At the 2005 WSM finals, two thirds of the athletes were under contract with the WSCF. Since its inception the WSMCF has organised events in many countries including: United States of America, Canada, Germany, Austria, Russia, Serbia, Poland and Spain. Its flagship event was the World Strongman Cup.

Following a financial dispute with the World Strongman Cup Federation Vlad Redkin, one of its chief organisers, left to found the World Strongman Federation. Following Vlad's departure, the WSCF ceased to promote events and effectively disappeared from the strength athletics landscape. In September 2007 an event in Khanty-Mansijsk formerly affiliated to WSMC and featuring its athletes was promoted by Vlad Redkin. This event had its name changed at short notice from WSMC to the Grand Prix of Khanty-Mansijsk (Russia) and in effect was the first WSF event. The reason given after the competition by Redkin was that a combination of financial reasons as well as concerns over WSMCF's stated aim of forming closer ties with the International Federation of Strength Athletes led him to part company with WSMCF. He initially planned to cooperate closely with the World Strongman Super Series in 2008, but in fact set up a new federation called the World Strongman Federation.

World Strongman Cup
The World Strongman Cup has been run since 2004. It is organised as a tour event with many competitions held throughout the globe. The overall winner is ascertained through the cumulation of points scored across the season.

List of Champions

Notes
All names from Dave Horne's world of grip

2003

Results from the archive of www.world-strongmancup.at

2004

Results from the archive of www.world-strongmancup.at (with the exception of the identification of the overall winner)

2005

2006

2007

Grand Prix of Khanty-Mansijsk
Originally, another event in Khanty-Mansijsk in September 2007 was affiliated to WSMC and featured its athletes. However, the promoter of the event, Vlad Redkin, changed the name from WSMC to the Grand Prix of Khanty-Mansijsk (Russia). The reason given was that after the competition Redkin was parting company with WSMC due to his concerns over WSMC wanting closer ties with the International Federation of Strength Athletes. He also cited that he had lost money with WSMC. He initially planned to cooperate closely with the World Strongman Super Series in 2008, but in fact set up a new federation called the World Strongman Federation.

Date: 8 September 2007

Charity
The charity aims to reduce and tackle obesity in children by helping more children to take part in sporting activities. It is the charity's belief that "As these children become more interested in and able to enjoy sports of their choosing, their physical and emotional conditions show significant improvement. This provides a strong foundation for improved self-confidence and happiness for all participants." The federation believes that their athletes can act as positive examples.

References

External links
Official Site

Strength athletics organizations
Strongmen competitions